The Big Horn Wind Farm is a 200 megawatt wind farm in Klickitat County, Washington. It uses 133 GE Energy 1.5 MW wind turbines.  The wind farm is owned by Big Horn LLC, a subsidiary of Iberdrola Renewables. 98 percent of the land it is on remains available for traditional uses, such as hunting and farming.

References

Buildings and structures in Klickitat County, Washington
Energy infrastructure completed in 2007
Wind farms in Washington (state)
2007 establishments in Washington (state)